is a Japanese actress and voice actress from Tokyo who is affiliated with the Himawari Theatre Group. She debuted as an actress in 2002, playing a role in the television series First Love, and later appeared in several television series and commercials. Her first voice acting role in an anime was as the character Lulu in the anime television series Michiko & Hatchin. She is known for her roles as Hifumi Takimoto in the anime television series New Game!, Lynn Hughes in Wise Man's Grandchild, and Koharu Nanakura in Aikatsu Stars!.

Filmography

Anime
2008
Michiko & Hatchin as Lulu

2009
Tokyo Magnitude 8.0 as Hina Kusakabe
Mainichi Kaasan as Yuki-chan

2010
Cooking Idol Ai! Mai! Main! as Tomo

2016
New Game! as Hifumi Takimoto, Sōjirō
Aikatsu Stars! as Koharu Nanakura

2017
Akashic Records of Bastard Magic Instructor as Lynn Titis
New Game!! as Hifumi Takimoto, Sōjirō

2018
Tada Never Falls in Love as Tourist (episode 1), Town girl (episode 1)

2019
Wise Man's Grandchild as Lynn Hughes
Z/X Code reunion as Muramasa

2020
Asteroid in Love as Ao Manaka

2021
Wonder Egg Priority as Frill

2022
Cue! as Mahoro Miyaji

2023
The Fire Hunter as Hinako

Dubbing
Nanny McPhee (Christianna Brown (Holly Gibbs))

References

External links
Official agency profile 

1997 births
Living people
Japanese child actresses
Japanese video game actresses
Japanese voice actresses
Voice actresses from Tokyo